Jaymes Reunion are an American Christian music band from Bakersfield, California, and they started making music together in 2004. They have released two extended plays, The Fine (2008) and Jaymes Reunion (2009), and one studio album, Everything You've Been Looking For (2010), all with BEC Recordings.

Background
The band are from Bakersfield, California, where they started making music together in 2004. Their members are vocalist, guitarist, and pianist, Cameron Jaymes, lead guitarist, Braydon Nelson, bassist, Eric Watson, and percussionist, Jeremy Taylor and Jared Byers, while Byers has left the band, being replaced by Nick Clupny.

Music history
Their first extended play, The Fine, was released on July 8, 2008, from BEC Recordings. The subsequent extended play, Jaymes Reunion, was released on September 22, 2009, by BEC Recordings. They released, Everything You've Been Looking For, a studio album, on April 20, 2010, with BEC Recordings.<

Members
Current members
 Cameron Jaymes (born Cameron James Brier) – vocals, guitar, piano
 Braydon Nelson – guitar
 Eric Watson – bass
 Jeremy Taylor – percussion
 Nick Clupny
Past members
 Jared Byers – percussion

Discography
Studio albums
 Everything You've Been Looking For (April 20, 2010, BEC)
EPs
 The Fine (July 8, 2008, BEC)
 Jaymes Reunion (September 22, 2009, BEC)

References

External links

American musical duos
Musical groups established in 2004
Musical groups from Bakersfield, California
2004 establishments in California
BEC Recordings artists